Laristania is a monotypic snout moth genus described by Hans Georg Amsel in 1951. Its single species, Laristania sardzella, described by the same author, is found in Iran.

References

Phycitinae
Monotypic moth genera
Moths of Asia
Taxa named by Hans Georg Amsel
Pyralidae genera